Pavel Petrovich Kadochnikov (– 2 May 1988) was a Soviet and Russian actor, film director, screenwriter and pedagogue. People's Artist of the USSR (1979) and Hero of Socialist Labour (1985).

Biography
Pavel Kadochnikov was born in Petrograd in 1915. In 1927, he entered a children's artistic studio, dreaming to become a professional artist, but, because of the severe illness of his father, Pavel, as the elder in the family, was forced to become the apprentice to a metal craftsman. However, he continued to study in the studio. In 1929, he entered the actor's department of theatrical school of TYuZ. In 1935, he graduated from Leningrad Theatrical Institute and until 1944 was an actor in Leningrad's New TYuZ.

He began to act in the cinema in 1935. His first role was Mikhas in the film Maturity. Kadochnikov was not pleased the way he looked on the screen in his early roles, and he decided to never play in the cinema again. He did not stand by this decision. In 1937, he accepted Sergei Yutkevich's invitation and appeared in a minor role in the film The Man with the Gun. In many plays he performed several roles; in one of them he performed at once eight roles. In 1940, he played the roles of worker Lenka Sukhov and writer Maxim Gorky in the film Yakov Sverdlov directed by Sergei Yutkevich. In Ivan the Terrible by Sergei Eisenstein he not only conducted the tragic line of the pretender Vladimir of Staritsa, but also played two small roles (of Chaldean and Yevstafy).

His actor's range can be seen in his lyric roles (Anton Ivanovich is angry, The tamer of tigers) and in the role of Major Fedotov in the Secret Agent by Boris Barnet. The role of Major Fedotov was a cult character of Soviet cinema which mixed the pathetics, manly charm and irony. For the roles he took in the patriotic movies he won the Stalin Prize (in 1948 for the Secret Agent, in 1949 for the role of Aleksey Maresyev in the Tale of a True Man, in 1951 for the role of Kovshov in the film Far from Moscow). Time and again actor appeared in the role of Maxim Gorky. From the 1960s onwards, he began to move away from patriotic roles.

In 1965 Kadochnikov directed his first film Musicians of One Regiment together with Gennadi Kazansky. This film is about the Civil War. It showed his interest in folklore heroes. In 1968 he filmed the fairy tale of Alexander Ostrovsky, titled The Snow Maiden (he also played the role of Berendey). In 1970-1980s, he did roles from the classical repertoire: Triletsky in the Unfinished play for the mechanical piano, Prince Kuchumov in Easy money, and the picturesque figures of "Russian old men" (eternal grandfather in Siberiade and uncle Roman in Here they did not fly in seagull). In Lenin in Paris he plays Paul Lafargue. In later years he played in the character roles (Adventures of Sherlock Holmes, Last visit); staged films I Shall Never Forget (about the fate of Soviet soldier and his wife, separated by war) and Silver strings (about the Russian virtuoso balalaika-player Vasily Andreyev).

His granddaughter is Danish-born actress, singer, songwriter and model Nina Bergman.

Filmography

As actor

 Sovershennoletiye (1935) - Mikhas
 Chelovek s ruzhyom (1938)
 Yakov Sverdlov (1940) - Gorki
 Razgrom Yudenicha (1941) - Senyushkin
 Anton Ivanovich Is Angry (1941) - Aleksei Petrovich Mukhin
 Fortress on the Volga (1942, part 1, 2) - Rudnev
 Ivan the Terrible (1944) - Vladimir Andreyevich Staritsky
 Hello Moscow! (1945) - Konstantin Nikolaevich Zlatogorov (uncredited)
 Robinzon Kruzo (1947) - Robinson Crusoe
 Secret Agent (1947) - Mayor Aleksey Fedotov
 Blue Roads (1948) - Sergey Ratanov
 Dragotsennye zyorna (1948) - Ivan Arkhipov
 Tale of a True Man (1948) - Aleksey Meresyev
 U nikh est Rodina (1950) - Aleksey Petrivich Dobrynin
 Zagovor obrechyonnykh (1950) - Maks Venta
 Far from Moscow (1951) - Kovshov
 A Big Family (1954) - Skobolev
 The Boys from Leningrad (1954) - Dedushkin Svetlanov
 Tamer of Tigers (1955) - Fyodor Yermolayev
 Pedagogicheskaya poema (1955) - Aleksei Maximovich "Maxim" Gorky
 Talanty i poklonniki (1956) - Pyotr Meluzov
 Medovyy mesyats (1956) - Aleksei Rybalchenko
 Baltiyskaya slava (1957)
 Pod zolotym orlom (1958) - Andrey Makarov
 Ivan the Terrible, Part II (1958) - Vladimir Andreyevich Staritsky
 Prolog (1958) - Maxim Gorky
 Syn Iristona (1960) - Dzhambul Dzakhsorov
 Russkiy suvenir (1960) - Homer Johns, Mr. Scott's aid
 Khleb i rozy (1960) - Gavriil Ivushkin
 The Slowest Train (1963) - kapitan Sergey Sergeyev
 Gosudarstvennyy prestupnik (1964) - Aleksey Basov
 Prodavetz vozdukha (1967) - Prof Engelbrekt
 Snow Maiden (1969) - Tsar Berendey
 Farewell to St. Petersburg (1972) - Pavel Maksimov
 Skripkanin sargüzasti (1973)
 Bakida külaklar asir (1974) - Kastanov
 Odinnadtsat nadezhd (1976) - Minor Role (uncredited)
 An Unfinished Piece for Mechanical Piano (1977) - Ivan Ivanovich Triletskiy
 The Seagulls Did Not Fly Here (1978)
 Life of Beethoven (1978, TV Movie) - Romain Rolland
 Siberiade (1979) - vechniy Ded
 Ishchi vetra... (1979) - Sergey Sergeyevich
 Ya khochu pet (1979)
 Ty tolko ne platy (1979) - Boris Platonovich
 Oblomov (1980)
 Santa Esperansa (1980) - Don Lorenzo
 Rasskaz neizvestnogo cheloveka (1981) - Graf Orlov
 Sitsilianskaya zashchita (1981) - Andrian Konstantinovich (Museum director)
 Idealnyy muzh (1981) - Lord Caversham
 Propavshiye sredi zhivykh (1981) - Fyodor Borisovich Kashlev
 Lenin in Paris (1981) - Paul Lafargue
 Noch na chetvyortom kruge (1981)
 Dve strochki melkim shriftom (1981)
 Beshenye dengi (1982)
 The Treasures of Agra (1983, (TV Mini-Series) - Major Sholto
 Quarantine (1983) - Great-grandfather
 Ya tebya nikogda ne zabudu (1983)
 The Blonde Around the Corner (1984) - Corresponding member Ogurtsov
 Blistayushchiy mir (1984)
 Tri protsenta riska (1985)
 Dark Eyes (1987) - 1e Funzionario Pietroburgo
 Silver Strings (1987)

As director and scenario
 Musicians of One Regiment (1965) - director
  The Snow Maiden (1968) - director and scenario
 I Shall Never Forget (1983) - director and scenario
 Silver Strings (1987) - director and scenario

References

External links
 
 
  Biography
  Stories about Kadochnikov
  Biography

1915 births
1988 deaths
20th-century Russian male actors
20th-century Russian screenwriters
Male actors from Saint Petersburg
Communist Party of the Soviet Union members
Russian State Institute of Performing Arts alumni
Cannes Film Festival Award for Best Actor winners
Heroes of Socialist Labour
Honored Artists of the RSFSR
People's Artists of the RSFSR
People's Artists of the USSR
Stalin Prize winners
Recipients of the Order of Friendship of Peoples
Recipients of the Order of Lenin
Recipients of the Order of the Red Banner of Labour
Russian drama teachers
Russian film directors
Russian male film actors
Russian male stage actors
Russian male voice actors
Russian screenwriters
Soviet drama teachers
Soviet film directors
Soviet male film actors
Soviet male stage actors
Soviet male voice actors
Soviet screenwriters
Burials at Serafimovskoe Cemetery